Lincoln Creek is a stream in Andrew County in the U.S. state of Missouri.

Lincoln Creek was named after John Lincoln, a member of the Lincoln family who was the proprietor of a local gristmill.

See also
List of rivers of Missouri

References

Rivers of Andrew County, Missouri
Rivers of Missouri